Alex Bolt and Andrew Whittington were the defending champions, but Bolt decided not to participate this year. Whittington played alongside Karunuday Singh and lost in the final.

Bai Yan and Wu Di won the title, defeating Whittington and Singh in the final, 6–3, 6–4.

Seeds

Draw

References
 Main Draw

Anning Open - Doubles
2015 Doubles